was a Japanese comedian and actor. He was a member of the comedy trio Dachō Club.

References

1961 births
2022 deaths
2022 suicides
Japanese male actors
Japanese male comedians
Japanese impressionists (entertainers)
Japanese television personalities
People from Hyōgo Prefecture
Suicides by hanging in Japan